Yeravna-Khorga Lake System is a group of relatively shallow fresh water bodies in the Yeravninsky District, Buryatia, Russia. The villages of Isinga, Khorga, Tuldun, Gunda, Shiringa, Garam, as well as Sosnovo-Ozerskoye, the district capital, are located near the lakes. 

There are fisheries of local importance in most of the lakes of the group.

Geography
The lake system lies in the Yeravna Depression, at the southern end of the Vitim Plateau. The catchment area of the lake system is located in a forest steppe zone.

Bolshoy Yeravna (Big Yeravna) is the largest lake of the group, followed by neighboring Maly Yeravna (Small Yeravna). Other lakes of the system include Sosnovo, Khaimisanov and Bolshoy Goluboy —with Goluboy and Maly Goluboy close to it— in the southern cluster, known as "Yeravna Lakes". There are many small lakes further to the southwest.

In the northern section lie Gunda, Eksend (Эксенд), Arshan, Khynter (Хынтер), Khorga and Malaya Khorga, as well as Isinga, the northernmost of the group.

Hydrography
When the water levels are high the Yeravna lakes are connected with each other by intermittent channels. The outlet of the lake area is via the Khorga lakes to the northeast through the Kholoy, a small, shallow tributary of the Vitim River flowing from Isinga lake at the northeastern end.

See also
List of lakes of Russia

Bibliography
A. M. Plyusnin & E. G. Peryazeva, Hydrological and hydrochemical characteristics of the lakes in the Eravninskaya depression, 2012, DOI 10.1134/s1875372812020060

References

External links